William Harrison Story (31 May 1857 – 13 July 1924) was an Australian politician.

Biography
Born in Adelaide, he was educated at state schools before becoming a stonemason and bricklayer. He served as President of the Operative Masons and Bricklayers Society and the Adelaide Trades and Labour Council, and was mayor of the Town of Kensington and Norwood from 1901 to 1902.

In 1903, he was elected to the Australian Senate as a Labor Senator from South Australia. In the 1916 Labor split, he was one of several Labor parliamentarians who joined Prime Minister Billy Hughes in leaving the Labor Party over the issue of conscription, eventually joining with the Commonwealth Liberal Party to form the Nationalist Party.

Story transferred to the House of Representatives in 1917, winning the seat of Boothby as a Nationalist. He was the first South Australian to have served in both houses of federal parliament. He held the seat until 1922, when he was defeated by Jack Duncan-Hughes, a member of the breakaway Liberal Party.

Story died in 1924, aged 67.

References

Australian Labor Party members of the Parliament of Australia
Nationalist Party of Australia members of the Parliament of Australia
Members of the Australian House of Representatives for Boothby
Members of the Australian House of Representatives
Members of the Australian Senate for South Australia
Members of the Australian Senate
Mayors of places in South Australia
Australian bricklayers
Australian stonemasons
1857 births
1924 deaths
National Labor Party members of the Parliament of Australia
20th-century Australian politicians